The Abidji are an Akan people who live in the Ivory Coast.

References

Ethnic groups in Ghana